2016 Summer League of Legends Champions Korea (2016 Summer LCK) is part of the League of Legends Champions Korea (LCK), the top level of League of Legends play in Korea. Matches are played at the Seoul OGN e-Stadium in Mapo-gu, Seoul.

The winner of the playoffs, ROX Tigers, automatically qualified for the 2016 League of Legends World Championship.

Regular season standings

As of July 7, 2016

Playoff bracket

References

External links
 English information

2010s in Seoul
2016 in South Korea
2016 in South Korean sport
2016 in esports
League of Legends competitions
League of Legends Champions Korea seasons